Michael Wayne Parsons (3 October 1960 – 24 April 2009) was an Australian rules footballer who played for the Sydney Swans in the Victorian/Australian Football League (VFL/AFL) and North Adelaide in the South Australian National Football League (SANFL).

Parsons grew up in Legana, Tasmania. He first played football as a junior with Launceston.  He played under ex-St.Kilda defender Roy Apted who coached the young Blues to the 1976 Under 16 premiership in the Northern Tasmanian Junior Football Association (NTJFA).  Nicknamed "Bristles", Parsons was initially a talented basketball player also, winning a basketball scholarship to Utah. Upon returning to Australia he played for the Launceston Casino City in the National Basketball League. Most notably, he played at Launceston in the 1981 NBL Season, where they were league Champions.   Parsons later moved to Adelaide to continue his studies, where he played for the West Adelaide Bearcats in the NBL.

Parsons later converted to Australian Rules Football, playing as a ruckman. He is best remembered in football circles for his Jack Oatey Medal winning performance in North Adelaide's 1987 SANFL Grand Final win. He was then recruited to Sydney with the tenth pick in the 1987 VFL Draft but struggled to make an impact in his three years, although he gathered three Brownlow Medal votes for his 23 disposal effort in a match against the West Coast Eagles midway through his first season. Parsons returned to North Adelaide in 1991 and finished the year as a member of another premiership team.

In 2008, Parsons suffered a stroke and was revealed to be suffering from a brain tumour. He died in hospital on 24 April 2009.

References

Sources
Holmesby, Russell and Main, Jim. The Encyclopedia of AFL Footballers (7th edition). Melbourne: Bas Publishing (2007)

External links

1960 births
2009 deaths
Australian men's basketball players
Australian rules footballers from South Australia
Basketball players from South Australia
Deaths from brain tumor
Deaths from cancer in New South Wales
North Adelaide Football Club players
Sydney Swans players